The  is an archaeological site containing three groups of late Kofun period burial mounds located in the Miyaguchi neighborhood of the city of Jōetsu, Niigata in the Hokuriku region of Japan. The site was designated a National Historic Site of Japan in 1976.

Overview
The Miyaguchi Kofun Group is located in the Takada Plains of the Jōetsu region of Niigata Prefecture, on the alluvial fan of the Inada River near the Sea of Japan. The site was discovered in 1929, and archaeological excavations were conducted from 1973. The site consists of three groups of kofun. Site A was found to contain 18 tumuli, Site B to the east was found to have eight tumuli, and Site C located slightly to the south of Site A was found to have five tumuli. All of the kofun were circular-type, with a diameter of four to five meters. All of the tumuli are concentrated in a small area of approximately 1.5 hectare. 

Each of the tumuli had lateral burial chambers ranging from 70 to 140 cm in width and around two meters in length, with the largest, No.11, having a length of 6.6 meters. 

Grave goods recovered include Sue ware, straight iron swords, parts of armor, horse fittings and items of jewellery. From these grave goods, it is estimated that these tombs were constructed from the middle of the 6th century to the middle of the 7th century.

Gallery

See also
List of Historic Sites of Japan (Niigata)

References

External links

 Joetsu Tourist information page 
Joetsu City home page 

Kofun
History of Niigata Prefecture
Jōetsu, Niigata
Historic Sites of Japan
Archaeological sites in Japan
Museums in Niigata Prefecture